"L'infinito" is a poem written by Giacomo Leopardi probably in the autumn of 1819. The poem is a product of Leopardi's yearning to travel beyond his restrictive home town of Recanati and experience more of the world which he had studied. It is widely known within Italy.

Themes 

The poem, though vague and ethereal in its composition, conveys elements of the philosophical and classical worlds, the latter visible in the selection of the word , from ancient Greek rather than using a more conventional  to convey the isolatedness of this hill. This personification of natural environment is prominent throughout the poem and is typical of another theme or movement often associated with Leopardi; romanticism. There is also a keen sense of mortality throughout the poem, conveyed in the dying of seasons and drowning of thoughts, akin to Leopardi's belief that he would not live long, a belief affirmed when he died aged only 38.

Original Text

Literal English Translation 

Always dear to me was this solitary hill
and this hedge, which, from so many parts
of the far horizon, the sight excludes.
But sitting and gazing, endless
spaces beyond it, and inhuman
silences, and the deepest quiet
I fake myself in my thoughts; where almost
my heart scares. And as the wind
I hear rustling through these trees, I, that
infinite silence, to this voice
keep comparing: and I feel the eternal,
the dead seasons, the present,
and living one, and the sound of her. So in this
immensity drown my own thoughts:
and sinking in this sea is sweet to me.

Alternate translation
This lonely hill was always dear to me,
and this hedgerow, which cuts off the view
of so much of the last horizon.
But sitting here and gazing, I can see
beyond, in my mind’s eye, unending spaces,
and superhuman silences, and depthless calm,
till what I feel
is almost fear. And when I hear
the wind stir in these branches, I begin
comparing that endless stillness with this noise:
and the eternal comes to mind,
and the dead seasons, and the present
living one, and how it sounds.
So my mind sinks in this immensity:
and foundering is sweet in such a sea.

(translated by Jonathan Galassi)

Sonnet translation
I’ve always loved this solitary hill,
I’ve always loved this hedge that hides from me
So much of what my earthly eyes can see.
For as I sit and gaze, all calm and still,
I conjure up my thoughts; my mind I fill
With distances that stretch out boundlessly
And silences that somehow cannot be
Heard by my heart, which feels a sudden chill.
It seems these rustling leaves, this silence vast
Blend into one. Eternity draws nigh.
The present sounds and seasons, those long past
Become one sea of endless lives and deaths.
My thought is drowned, and yet it does not die:
It plunges into sweet, refreshing depths.

(translated by Z.G., with the title "Boundless Depths")

Modern usage
The poem is recited in the film One Hundred Steps by the film's hero Impastato, with which the film draws a parallel between Impastato and Leopardi.

See also
 Monte Tabor (Recanati), the described mountain in the poem.

References

1819 poems
Italian poems
Works by Giacomo Leopardi